Shahrul is a Malaysian given name and may refer to:

Shahrul Aizad (born 1993), aka Cotang, Malaysian professional footballer
Mohd Shahrul Mat Amin (born 1989), Malaysian cyclist
Shahrul Igwan (born 1994), Malaysian footballer for Kelantan
Shahrul Nizam Mustapa (born 1981), aka Arul, Malaysian former footballer
Shahrul Nizam Nadzir (born 1996), Malaysian footballer
Shahrul Nizam (born 1998), Malaysian professional footballer
Shahrul Saad (born 1993), Malaysian professional footballer
Nik Shahrul (born 1990), Malaysian professional footballer
Ahmad Shahrul Azhar Sofian (born 1974), Malaysian former footballer
Shahrul Azhar Ture (born 1985), Malaysian footballer
Shahrul Zaman Yahya, Malaysian politician, member of the Perak State Executive Council